The 2014 International GT Open season was the ninth season of the International GT Open, the grand tourer-style sports car racing founded in 2006 by the Spanish GT Sport Organización. It began on 3 May at the Nürburgring and finished on 2 November, at Circuit de Barcelona-Catalunya after eight double-header meetings, and a total of sixteen races.

The overall GT Open title – determined by race results within two specific classes as well as overall results – was claimed by SMP Racing Russian Bears duo Roman Mavlanov and Daniel Zampieri, taking three class and overall race wins over the course of the season. Mavlanov and Zampieri won the championship by 10 points ahead of V8 Racing's Nicky Pastorelli and Miguel Ramos. Pastorelli and Ramos won five races overall, and took two further victories in the Super GT class, taking the most wins over the course of the season. A point further behind in third place was 2013 champion Andrea Montermini, with team-mate Niccolò Schirò, at Scuderia Villorba Corse. Although Montermini and Schirò outscored Pastorelli and Ramos on gross scores, a dropped score per the series' sporting regulations cost the Villorba Corse duo the runner-up position. Montermini and Schirò took two race victories, at Jerez and Barcelona. Other overall wins were taken by Maxime Soulet, who won races at the Nürburgring with Nick Catsburg and Portimão with Isaac Tutumlu, while Tutumlu also shared a victory with Archie Hamilton at Spa-Francorchamps. The only overall win for a GTS car came in the final race of the season, as Viacheslav Maleev and José Manuel Pérez-Aicart – team-mates to Mavlanov and Zampieri – headed the field.

In the respective class championships, Mavlanov and Zampieri won the Super GT drivers' championship by five points over Pastorelli and Ramos. Again, just like the overall championship, Montermini and Schirò outscored Pastorelli and Ramos on gross scores, but a dropped score per the series' sporting regulations cost the Villorba Corse duo the runner-up position. In GTS, AF Corse driver Giorgio Roda was crowned champion, having shared his car with Andrea Piccini, Paolo Ruberti and Marco Cioci over the course of the year. Roda won races at the Nürburgring and Monza, to win the title by nine points ahead of Pérez-Aicart, who won five races in class. Maleev finished third in class, after he missed the Silverstone round, where he was replaced by Joan Vinyes. In the teams' championships, V8 Racing won in Super GT by 51 points ahead of SMP Racing Russian Bears, while AF Corse comfortably won in GTS, finishing 123 points clear of their nearest rivals.

Entry list

Race calendar and results
 An eight-round provisional calendar was revealed on 6 November 2013. On 23 January 2014 it was announced that the rounds at Jerez and Portimão would switch dates.

Championship standings
Scoring system

Drivers' Championships
For the Drivers' Championships, the best 13 results counted towards the final championship standings. Any other results were discarded.

Super GT

GTS

References

External links
 

International GT Open
International GT Open seasons